|}

	 

The Imperial Cup is a Premier Handicap National Hunt hurdle race in Great Britain which is open to horses aged four years or older. It is run at Sandown Park over a distance of about 2 miles (1 mile, 7 furlongs and 216 yards, or ), and during its running there are eight hurdles to be jumped. It is a handicap race, and it is scheduled to take place each year in March.

The Imperial Cup was first run in 1907, and in its early years it was considered to be the most important hurdle race of the season. A notable winner during this period was Trespasser, who recorded three successive victories in the race from 1920 to 1922. It continued to be the most prestigious hurdling event until the launch of the Champion Hurdle in 1927.

The race is run on a Saturday in March, three days before the start of the Cheltenham Festival. The sponsors of the Imperial Cup have offered a financial bonus prize to the owner of the winning horse since 1992, awarded if the horse goes on to win any race at the following week's Festival. Winners of this bonus have included Olympian (who won the Coral Cup at Cheltenham), Blowing Wind (County Hurdle) and Gaspara (Fred Winter Hurdle). . The 2016 running was unsponsored and no bonus was offered. The bonus returned in 2017 when new sponsors Matchbook offered a £50,000 prize, which they increased to £100,000 for the 2018 running. The race was upgraded from Listed to Grade Three status by the British Horseracing Board from its 2014 running. It was re-classified as a Premier Handicap from the 2023 running when Grade 3 status was renamed by the British Horseracing Authority.

Records
Most successful horse since 1947 (2 wins):
 Secret Service - 1949, 1950
 High Point – 1952, 1953
 Precious Boy – 1991, 1994

Leading jockey since 1947 (5 wins):
 Tony McCoy – Blowing Wind (1998), Polar Red (2002), Korelo (2003), Gaspara (2007), Qaspal (2010)

Leading trainer since 1947 (6 wins):
 Martin Pipe – Travel Mystery (1989), Olympian (1993), Blowing Wind (1998), Polar Red (2002), Korelo (2003), Medison (2005)

Winners since 1947
 Weights given in stones and pounds.

See also
 Horse racing in Great Britain
 List of British National Hunt races

References

 Racing Post:
 Timeform Chasers & Hurdlers Statistical Companion 1992–93
 horseracinghistory.co.uk – profile of Trespasser, a three-time winner of the Imperial Cup.

External links
 Race Recordings 

National Hunt races in Great Britain
Sandown Park Racecourse
National Hunt hurdle races
Recurring sporting events established in 1907
1907 establishments in England